The Century Conference is a co-operative group of California high school athletic leagues that formerly made up the Century League.  Its member schools now comprise the Crestview League and the North Hills League.  It is part of the CIF Southern Section. Members are located in Orange County.

Members
 Canyon High School
 Foothill High School
 Brea Olinda High School	
 Villa Park High School
 El Dorado High School
 Esperanza High School	
 El Modena High School
 Yorba Linda High School

References

CIF Southern Section leagues